Gelemiç is a village in the Keles district of Bursa Province in Turkey. It has a population of around 504 inhabitants.

References

Villages in Keles District